Cerqueira César is a municipality in the state of São Paulo in Brazil. The population is 20,191 (2020 est.) in an area of 512 km². The elevation is 737 m.

References

Municipalities in São Paulo (state)